No Sleep 'til Hammersmith is the first live album by English rock band Motörhead, released on 22 June 1981 by Bronze Records. It peaked at number one on the UK Albums Chart. It was followed by the release of the single "Motorhead" (backed with the non-album track "Over the Top") on 3 July, which peaked on the UK Singles Chart at number 6.

Background
After releasing three albums and touring for five years, Motörhead's 1980 album Ace of Spades (their first LP to be released in the United States) gave the band its first taste of major success. However, as drummer Phil "Philthy Animal" Taylor wryly notes in the documentary The Guts and the Glory:

In February 1981, the band released the St. Valentine's Day Massacre EP co-recorded with Girlschool, and in March headed out on a British jaunt called the "Short Sharp Pain in the Neck" tour, from which the songs on No Sleep 'til Hammersmith would be picked.

Recording
The original No Sleep 'Til Hammersmith LP includes two songs from their debut album, the title track from 1979's Bomber, five songs from 1979's Overkill, and three songs from Ace of Spades. The track "Motorhead" would be released as a single and become the band's biggest hit to date, reaching number 6 in the UK. Bar "Iron Horse/Born to Lose", which was from a 1980 show, No Sleep 'til Hammersmith was recorded at Leeds and Newcastle shows during the Short Sharp Pain in the Neck tour. The name of the tour referred to an injury sustained by Taylor when he was dropped on his head during after-show horseplay.

The title is a reference to the major London music venue the Hammersmith Odeon (now Apollo); often the last stop on the band's UK tours. But despite the name, this venue was not played on this tour, the shows being:
 27 March 1981: West Runton Pavilion, Norfolk, England
 28 March 1981: Queen's Hall, Leeds, England
 29 March 1981: City Hall, Newcastle, England
 30 March 1981: City Hall, Newcastle, England
 3 April 1981: Maysfield Leisure Centre, Belfast, Northern Ireland

Backstage at Leeds and Newcastle, the band were presented with silver and gold records for sales of Ace of Spades, silver for Overkill and silver for "Please Don't Touch".  The sound at Leeds Queens hall was not good and most of the original album is taken from Newcastle. Vocalist and bassist Lemmy stated that originally they intended No Sleep 'til Hammersmith to be a double album but they only had enough material for three sides. 

At the time of the album's release, the band were in the middle of their first tour of North America, supporting Ozzy Osbourne. "When 'No Sleep 'Til Hammersmith' came out", Lemmy told James McNair of Mojo in 2011, "it made a difference financially, but a lot of it went back into the show."

Reception

No Sleep 'til Hammersmith is the band's peak in terms of chart positions. In the wake of the success of the St. Valentine's Day Massacre EP and Ace of Spades album and single, it entered the UK chart at number one. Lemmy believed its success was due to a building anticipation from their fan base for a live album, due to the band having toured so heavily in the past, but also considered it their "downfall" due to the difficulty in following up its success. 

Jason Birchmeier of AllMusic wrote, "the performance: in a word, it's breakneck. [...] Motörhead could do no wrong at this point in time, as they were laying the foundation for the coming thrash movement, in a way, and their winning streak continues here on No Sleep 'Til Hammersmith, one of the best live metal albums of all time." In the 2011 book Overkill: The Untold Story of Motörhead, biographer Joel McIver calls it "the peak of the Lemmy/Clarke/Philthy line-up's career". Robert Christgau wrote, "Vic Maile's power-packed definition obliterates my bias against live recording. Remakes of white lies like 'No Class' and 'Stay Clean' and calling cards like 'Bomber' and 'Motorhead' save valuable shelf space. So what if it gives me a headache? Sometimes a headache comes as a relief."

The Daily Telegraph rated it the best live album of all time. It is also featured in the book 1001 Albums You Must Hear Before You Die.

References to the title
The title of the band's third live album, Nö Sleep at All, refers to the title of this album.

The album title was also referenced by the Beastie Boys on the track "No Sleep till Brooklyn" from their album Licensed to Ill.

Track listing

Original edition

Metal-Is Records 2001 2-CD re-issue edition

 All track dates taken from the liner notes
'Iron Horse/Born to Lose' was recorded at an unspecified location in 1980, on the 1980 European tour (thus between 7 February and 20 April 1980), the same tour as The Golden Years EP, which are also unspecified on any releases.

2021 40th anniversary edition 
No Sleep 'til Hammersmith was reissued on 25 June 2021 via Sanctuary/BMG for its 40th anniversary across a number of formats, including a four-CD deluxe edition with previously unreleased performances. The record featured tracks from the band’s Short Sharp Pain in the Neck tour which saw them play Newcastle, Leeds, Norfolk and Belfast in the space of a week, in late March / early April 1981. This 40th anniversary reissue features a new remaster of the original album created from the original tapes. The four-CD edition includes five bonus tracks on the first disc (three of which are previously unreleased from a soundcheck) and features three previously unreleased full concerts from this tour: Leeds Queen Hall (28 March 1981) and both nights from Newcastle City Hall (29 & 30 March 1981). Just over half of the original album is from the Newcastle show on the 30 March. The box set includes 28-page book, poster, plectrum, tour pass, ticket, flyer & badge.

Personnel
Per the album's liner notes.
 Ian "Lemmy" Kilmister – lead vocals, bass
 "Fast" Eddie Clarke – guitar, backing vocals
 Phil "Philthy Animal" Taylor – drums

Production 
 Vic Maile – producer
 Ian Kalinowski – front sleeve photography
 Graham Mitchell – back sleeve photography
 Simon Porter – back sleeve photography

Release history

Charts

Weekly charts

Year-end charts

Certifications

References

External links

No Sleep 'til Hammersmith (Adobe Flash) at Radio3Net (streamed copy where licensed)

Albums produced by Vic Maile
Motörhead live albums
1981 live albums
Bronze Records live albums
Live heavy metal albums